Woźnawieś  is a village in the administrative district of Gmina Rajgród, within Grajewo County, Podlaskie Voivodeship, in north-eastern Poland. It is located within the historic region of Podlachia.

Woźnawieś is the birthplace of Józef Sienkiewicz, father of Polish writer and Nobel Prize laureate Henryk Sienkiewicz.

References

Villages in Grajewo County